Sarzedo may refer to the following places:

Brazil
 Sarzedo, Minas Gerais

Portugal
 Sarzedo (Arganil), a civil parish in the municipality of Arganil
 Sarzedo (Covilhã), a civil parish in the municipality of Covilhã 
 Sarzedo (Moimenta da Beira), a civil parish in the municipality of Moimenta da Beira

Parish name disambiguation pages